Hoff may refer to:

People
Hoff (surname)
Carolyn Ann Hoff (1946-2015), an American philanthropist 
 Christina Hoff Sommers, American author of feminist and sociological studies
 Von Hoff (surname)

Nicknamed
 Syd Hoff, cartoonist, known as "Hoff"
 David Hasselhoff, American actor and singer who is sometimes referred to as "The Hoff"
 Noah Hoffman, American Olympic skier, known as "The Hoff"

Places
Hoff, Cumbria, place in Northern England
Hoff Township, Minnesota

Structures
Hoff (station), light rail station on the Oslo Tramway
Hoff Building (Hotel Boise), an office building in Boise, Idaho, constructed in 1930
Hoff Church, an 11th-century Norwegian church

Companies
HOFF Norske Potetindustrier, a Norwegian manufacturer of potato products

Other
 Hoff crab, common name for a species of squa lobster in the genus Kiwa
 Van't Hoff (crater), crater on the Moon
 Van 't Hoff equation
 Van 't Hoff factor, formula used in physical chemistry
 Le Bel-van't Hoff rule

See also
 Drummer Hoff, a children's book
 Jacobus Henricus van 't Hoff (1852-1911) Dutch chemist
 Susanna Hoffs (born 1959) U.S. singer
 Tamar Simon Hoffs (born 1934) U.S. director
 Hof (disambiguation)
 van't Hof